Beaver Island is a small island in Northern Saskatchewan, Canada; surrounded by Reindeer Lake.

References 

Lake islands of Saskatchewan